Miyan Velayat Rural District is a rural district (dehestan) in the Central District of Mashhad County, Razavi Khorasan Province, Iran. At the 2006 census, its population was 20,397, in 4,885 families.  The rural district has 52 villages.

List of villages
Abbasabad
Abdolabad
Akbarabad
Asgariyeh
Ashk-e Zari
Bazeh Kalagh
Boshnu
Bozmargan
Chah Molla
Chahchah
Chenar Sukhteh
Dandaneh
Devin 
Eshqabad 
Fathabad-e Gorgha 
Fathabad-e Yazdiha 
Filian-e Qaem Maqam 
Filian-e Sofla 
Gonabad 
Hasanabad-e Gorji 
Hoseynabad-e Gusheh 
Jalali 
Javadieh 
Kalateh-ye Ali 
Kalateh-ye Qorban 
Kamin Geran 
Khan Saadat 
Kharabeh Amin 
Kurdeh 
Mesgaran 
Mohammadabad 
Nazeriyeh 
Nurabad 
Pain Deh 
Pariabad 
Qaderabad 
Reyhan 
Rezavieh 
Robatu 
Rowghan Garan 
Ruhabad 
Saghravan 
Sahl ol Din 
Sang-e Siah 
Sarvabad 
Shah Niaz 
Shah Rah 
Shahin 
Qaleh 
Shaqa 
Shir Hesar 
Soltanabad 
Tup Derakht

References 

Rural Districts of Razavi Khorasan Province
Mashhad County